

Matches
Scores and results list France's points tally first.

France tour
Rugby union tours of the United States
France national rugby union team tours
tour
France rugby union tour of the United States
France rugby union tour